A vahalkada, known as a frontispiece in English, is a structure constructed joining a stupa at its four cardinal directions as a decorative flourish. Later, these frontispieces came to be decorated or embellished with designs such as the creeper design. Stone slabs erected for the purpose of offering flower at the stupa too have been added to these frontispieces.

See also
Ancient stupas of Sri Lanka
Architecture of ancient Sri Lanka

References

Stupas in Sri Lanka
Architecture in Sri Lanka